2368 Beltrovata, provisional designation , is an eccentric stony asteroid and near-Earth object of the Amor group, approximately 2.7 kilometers in diameter. It was discovered on 4 September 1977, by Swiss astronomer Paul Wild at Zimmerwald Observatory near Bern, Switzerland. The asteroid was named for Betty Tendering, a friend of author Gottfried Keller.

Orbit and classification 

Beltrovata orbits the Sun in the inner main-belt at a distance of 1.2–3.0 AU once every 3 years and 1 month (1,116 days). Its orbit has an eccentricity of 0.41 and an inclination of 5° with respect to the ecliptic.

As an Amor asteroid, it approaches the orbit of Earth from the outside but does not cross it. The asteroid's observation arc begins with its official discovering observation at Zimmerwald.

Physical characteristics 

In the Tholen classification Beltrovata is a SQ-type asteroid, an intermediate between the common S-type and Q-type asteroids.

Rotation period 

A first rotational lightcurve of Beltrovata was obtained from photoelectric observations made by U.S. astronomers Edward Bowell and Schelte Bus in the 1970s, and gave a rotation period of  hours with a brightness variation of 0.84 magnitude. In 2000, the Near-Earth Objects Follow-up Program published an identical period but with a higher amplitude of 1.05 magnitude.().

Diameter and albedo 

According to the space-based survey carried out by the NEOWISE mission of NASA's Wide-field Infrared Survey Explorer, the asteroid measures 3.0 kilometers in diameter and its surface has an albedo of 0.16, while the Collaborative Asteroid Lightcurve Link assumes a standard albedo for stony asteroids of 0.20 and calculates a diameter of 2.7 kilometers with an absolute magnitude of 15.21.

Naming 

This minor planet is named "Beltrovata", which is the name by whom the Swiss author Gottfried Keller from Zürich called his friend Betty Tendering. She served as role model for the character of "Dortchen Schönfund" in Keller's novel Green Henry. The official naming citation was published by the Minor Planet Center on 1 August 1981.

References

External links 
 Asteroid Lightcurve Database (LCDB), query form (info )
 Dictionary of Minor Planet Names, Google books
 Asteroids and comets rotation curves, CdR – Observatoire de Genève, Raoul Behrend
 
 
 

002368
Discoveries by Paul Wild (Swiss astronomer)
Named minor planets
002368
19770904